Nikolaus Poda von Neuhaus (4 October 1723 – 29 April 1798) was an Austrian entomologist. In his branch of natural history, the short name Poda refers to him. 

Poda was born and died in Vienna. He was the author of Insecta Musei Graecensis (1761), the first purely entomological work to follow the binomial nomenclature of Carl Linnaeus.

External links
Landes Museum
Insecta musei Graecensis Online at GDZ
Insecta musaei Graecensis (Pdf) at Wikimedia commons

1723 births
1798 deaths
Scientists from Vienna
Austrian entomologists